Fabrice Maxime Sylvain Morvan (born 14 May 1966) is a French singer, songwriter, rapper, dancer, and model. He was half of the pop duo Milli Vanilli, along with Rob Pilatus, selling multi-platinum albums around the world. However, he was later involved in a scandal when the duo revealed that they had not actually sung on any of their recordings. After the scandal, the group reformed as Rob & Fab in the 1990s with limited success. Morvan had a solo comeback in the 2000s, releasing his first solo album, Love Revolution.

As of 2010, Morvan resides in Amsterdam and Los Angeles.

Biography

Early years
Morvan was born in 1966 in Paris, France, to parents from Pointe-à-Pitre, Guadeloupe. At 18, he moved to Germany, where he was a dancer and model, and was influenced by funk, soul, hip hop, and pop. He met Rob Pilatus in a nightclub in Munich, and they decided to form a rock/soul group.

From fame to shame 
Morvan and Pilatus were noticed by music producer Frank Farian, who signed them as part of a musical act. Shortly after a trip to Turkey, where they reputedly got the band's name from a local advertising slogan, Milli Vanilli was born. Morvan and Pilatus served as the public faces for singers Charles Shaw, John Davis, and Brad Howell, whom Farian thought were talented musicians but lacked a marketable image.

The first Milli Vanilli album was Girl You Know It's True. Despite critical derision, Milli Vanilli's fame continued to grow worldwide. The album had four hit singles: the title track, and the group's three #1 hits, "Girl I'm Gonna Miss You", "Baby Don't Forget My Number", and "Blame It on the Rain". Milli Vanilli won a Grammy Award for Best New Artist on 22 February 1990 for Girl You Know It's True.

Morvan and Pilatus were a frequent target of rumors and allegations of on-stage lip-synching and not having sung on the album. Shaw told a reporter the truth about Milli Vanilli but recanted after Farian paid him $155,000 to do so.

When Morvan and Pilatus pressured Farian to let them sing on the next album, Farian admitted to reporters on 15 November 1990 that Morvan and Pilatus had not actually sung on any of the records. As a result, Milli Vanilli's Grammy was withdrawn four days later, while Arista Records dropped the act from its roster and deleted their album and its masters from their catalogue, thus making Girl You Know It's True the largest-selling album to ever be deleted. A court ruling allowed any American who bought the album to get a partial refund.

Farian later attempted a failed comeback for the group without Morvan and Pilatus.

Aftermath
Months later, Morvan and Pilatus parodied the scandal in a commercial for Carefree sugarless gum. They began to lip sync to an opera recording. An announcer asked, as they were lip-synching, "How long does the taste of Carefree sugarless gum last?" The record then began to skip and the announcer answers, "Until these guys sing for themselves."

They then moved to Los Angeles, where they released an eponymous album under the name Rob & Fab. Despite positive reviews from critics, the album failed due to financial constraints, poor promotion, and the scandal surrounding Milli Vanilli's lip-synching allegations. Only around 2,000 copies were sold.

Rob Pilatus later served three months in jail for assault, vandalism, and attempted robbery. He spent six months on drug rehabilitation before returning to Germany, later to die in a 1998 drug overdose at the age of 32.

Solo comeback
Morvan spent several years as a session musician and public speaker. In 1998, he was hired as a radio DJ at famed L.A. radio station KIIS-FM. During this time, he also performed at the station's sold-out 1999 Wango Tango concert before 50,000 people at Dodger Stadium.

In 1997, Morvan was interviewed for the premiere episode of VH-1's Behind the Music. He was also featured in a 2000 BBC documentary on Milli Vanilli. Morvan then spent 2001 on tour, before performing in 2002 as the inaugural performer at the brand-new Velvet Lounge at the Hard Rock Café Hotel in Orlando, Florida.

In 2003, Morvan released his first solo album, Love Revolution, producing, recording, writing, and singing all the tracks. On 14 April 2011, Morvan released a new single, "Anytime", to digital outlets.

On 25 May 2012, Morvan released a single, "See the Light", with a new band, Fabulous Addiction.

In March 2014, it was mentioned that Morvan was working on his next single in Los Angeles with producer Clarence Jey and singer Delious Kennedy from U.S. R&B group All-4-One.

In 2016, Morvan appeared in a documentary-style KFC commercial that focuses on his life and music career after Milli Vanilli.

Morvan also DJs for private Heineken functions at the Heineken Experience center in Amsterdam. As a solo musician, Morvan has worked with several DJs/producers including Don Diablo, Guy J, Dance Spirit, Desert Minds, DJ Prinz, Patrick BP Bruyndonx, MuziJunki, Sean McCaff, Limoncello, and Guan Elmzoom, and he has collaborated on well-received dance releases with several. Some of Morvan's other pursuits include writing, painting, and fashion design.

On November 1, 2022 Fab Morvan appeared in an ad/trailer for the Ryan Reynolds and Will Ferrell led Christmas Comedy “Spirited.” In the ad/trailer Reynolds and Ferrell are trying to “dispel rumors that they did not in fact LIP SYNC their singing in the holiday musical comedy.” The audience, however, will notice that Will and Ryan’s voices don’t sound quite right. It then cuts to a shot of Fab Morvan in a recording studio booth providing the voices for Ryan Reynolds and Will Ferrell.

Best of the Best album 
On 26 March 2007, the Milli Vanilli Best of the Best album was released.

Film projects 
On 14 February 2007, it was announced that Universal Pictures was developing a film based on the true story of Milli Vanilli's rise and fall in the music industry. Jeff Nathanson, a screenwriter known for Catch Me If You Can, was to write and direct the film. Morvan was supposed to serve as a consultant, providing his and Pilatus's point of view. However, the project was never completed. In 2011 German director Florian Gallenberger declared that he was reviving the project and would be rewriting the script. This ultimately didn't happen.

Director Bret Ratner attempted to make his version of a Milli Vanilli biopic, for which Morvan sold his exclusive life rights to Ratner's production company RatPac Entertainment, but the project was eventually cancelled in 2021 after numerous Time's Up sexual harassment allegations against Ratner became public.

Between 2021 and 2022, Simon Verhoeven directed and wrote the Milli-Vanilli biopic Girl You Know It's True, which was filmed in Munich, Berlin, Cape Town, and Los Angeles. The film was produced by Wiedemann & Berg Film, with Leonine as the theatrical distributor, due to be released in cinemas 2023. The movie stars Tijan Njie and Elan Ben Ali as Pilatus and Morvan as well as Matthias Schweighöfer as Farian. One of the executive producers is R&B music producer and performer Kevin Liles who composed the original version of "Girl You Know It's True" by his Baltimore DJ crew Numarx in 1986. Associate producers are Jasmin Davis, daughter of the late John Davis, and Brad Howell. Carmen Pilatus, sister of the late Rob Pilatus, Milli Vanilli’s former assistant Todd Headlee, and Ingrid Segieth a.k.a. Milli, are also attached as associate producers. Since Morvan had previously sold his film rights to Ratner, he couldn't be involved in Verhoeven's film.

On 4 July 2022, Morvan announced on his facebook fanpage that there is also a new documentary film about Milli Vanilli in the works, which is "[...] going to be a major eye opener for the world [...]"

Discography

Studio albums
Love Revolution (2003)

with Milli Vanilli
All or Nothing (1988)
Girl You Know It's True (1989)
Best of the Best (2007)

with Rob & Fab
Rob & Fab (1993)

with Fabulous Addiction
"See the Light" (2012)

with NightAir
"One of These Nights" (2014)

References

External links

1966 births
Living people
French pop singers
French male singer-songwriters
French male dancers
French male models
French people of Guadeloupean descent
English-language singers from France
French contemporary R&B singers
Black French musicians
Writers from Paris
Milli Vanilli members
20th-century French male singers
21st-century French male singers
French rappers
French male film actors
French expatriates in Germany
French expatriates in the Netherlands
French expatriates in the United States
Musical hoaxes
Entertainment scandals
Ich bin ein Star – Holt mich hier raus! participants